Lugașu de Jos is a commune in Bihor County, Crișana, Romania with a population of 3,580 people. It is composed of three villages: Lugașu de Jos, Lugașu de Sus (Felsőlugos) and Urvind (Örvénd).

References

Communes in Bihor County
Localities in Crișana